Scream is the third solo studio album by American musician Chris Cornell. Released on March 10, 2009, through Suretone Records and Mosley Music Group, it marked a shift from Cornell's previous musical efforts. Guitar and rock elements were largely excluded, replaced with producer Timbaland's electronic pop soundscapes. The album was promoted with the release of five digital singles and three music videos, and was met with mostly negative reviews. The album debuted in the U.S at number 10 on the Billboard 200 with 26,000 copies sold.

Production

Recording history
With the idea of remixing songs from his previous album Carry On (2007), Cornell first came into contact with Timbaland. However, the collaboration evolved into the duo writing and recording an entire album in just six weeks, notably with the conceptual direction of "tying it all together musically", which Cornell describes as "[harkening] back to albums that I listened to when I was a kid, where the music never stops" and that it "begs to be listened to on headphones all the way through".

Musical style
Billboard reported that Scream shows Cornell moving "in a much more pop-oriented direction, with busy drum machine beats, buffed-up chorus vocals and string samples filling the nooks and crannies", comparing it to Gnarls Barkley and less that of "the guitar-driven music of Cornell's past with Soundgarden and Audioslave". Despite the controversy caused by teaming up with Timbaland, Cornell insisted that he still played an integral part of the album's creation and didn't do what "Timbaland told me to do," further noting that they "didn't really have that relationship" and "it wasn't that type of a process. It was more, he would bring in a beat, an idea, I would write to it and sing it, and we would move on kind of to the next thing."

Describing the album as a whole, Cornell compared it to Pink Floyd's The Dark Side of the Moon and Queen's A Night at the Opera, citing the psychedelic elements that Timbaland brought into the production.

Reception

In the U.S, the album debuted at number 10 on the Billboard 200 and thus became Cornell's first top 10 solo album. The next week it dropped 55 places to number 65, which was the largest second-week drop for a top 10-debuting album in two and a half years. It spent 10 weeks on the Billboard 200.

Initial critical response towards the release was mixed to negative. At Metacritic, which assigns a normalized rating out of 100 to reviews from mainstream critics, the album has received an average score of 42, based on 19 reviews. Scream received positive reviews from Entertainment Weekly and Hot Press who felt that the collaboration between producer Timbaland and Chris Cornell worked. The mixed reviews were more prevalent, with Spin stating the album was "strangely appealing in its elaborately empty efficiency", while Billboard noted that "sometimes it's good bizarre. Other times it's bad bizarre." Rolling Stone wrote that Scream "veers between drab–sleek and rock–dude soulful; Cornell's yowl never sounds at home". Among the negative reviews, Allmusic wrote that "Scream is one of those rare big-budget disasters, an exercise in misguided ambition that makes no sense outside of pure theory."

Nine Inch Nails creator Trent Reznor attacked the album, suggesting on Twitter that Cornell had "embarrass(ed)" himself. Reznor regretted his comments, writing an apology email to Cornell when both Nine Inch Nails and Soundgarden announced a co-headlining tour.

Track listing
All songs written by Chris Cornell, additional unconfirmed writing credits below.

Bonus tracks

Personnel

Musicians
Chris Cornell - lead vocals
Timbaland - all instruments
Jerome Harmon - all instruments
DJ Timmy T - DJ scratching
Demo Castellon - additional programming
Dan Warner - all additional guitars
Lee Levin - additional live drums (6, 8)
Darryl Pearson - additional live bass (1, 13), additional live bass, guitars and background vocals (8)
Justin Timberlake - additional background vocals (7)
Amar - additional background vocals (7)
Ryan Tedder - additional background vocals (6)
Jim Beanz - additional background vocals (2, 3, 4, 5, 7, 10, 11, 12, 13)
Ezekiel Lewis - additional background vocals (1, 2, 8)
Brent Kutzle - additional cello (10)
Peter Thorn - additional guitars (10, 12)
Jason Sutter - additional live drums (12)
Lasim Richards - horns (1)
Frank Chadwyck Bernstein - horns (1)
Brian Keegan - horns (1)
Rashawn Ross - horns (1)
Phil Lassiter - horns (1)

Production
Timbaland - production (all songs), executive producer
Jerome Harmon - production (all songs)
Demo Castellon - mixing, recording, co-executive producer, mixing (5, 10, 12)
Julian Vazquez Jr. - recording, mixing (10)
Jim Beanz - vocal production
Chris Gehringer - mastering
Chris Godbey - Pro Tools editing, additional recording, mixing (5)
Ron Taylor - Pro Tools editing, additional recording
Chris Carroll - additional recording
Fareed Salamah - additional recording, mixing (12), 2nd mix assistant
King Logan - co-production (10)
Peter Thorn - additional guitar recording (10, 12)
Tom Weir - additional live drums recording (12)
Scott Eric Olivier - additional live drums recording (12)
Brandon Jones - assistant engineer
Alex Graupera - assistant engineer
Miguel Bustamante - assistant engineer
Chad Jolly - assistant engineer
Rick Bryant - assistant engineer
Sebastian de Peyrecave - assistant engineer

Rock versions
There are currently two Scream tracks that have had "Rock Versions" of them released. The first being an alternate version of "Long Gone", produced by Howard Benson, which was accompanied by an official music video directed by DJ Skee's Skee.tv.

The second track to come to light was a "Rock Version" of "Never Far Away". This version was not a remix, but a completely new recording, produced by Jordon Zadorozny. It has yet to be released for purchase, but has been, with permission from Cornell himself, made available for streaming by Alan Cross. In October 2009, it was reported that Cornell was working with Jordon Zadorozny and Michael Friedman to rework the entire Scream album but then Chris rejoined Soundgarden. No further development on the project had been made between Cornell rejoining Soundgarden and his death on May 18, 2017.

Charts

References

2009 albums
Albums produced by Jerome "J-Roc" Harmon
Albums produced by Timbaland
Albums produced by Justin Timberlake
Albums produced by Ryan Tedder
Chris Cornell albums
Electropop albums
Dance-pop albums by American artists
Pop rock albums by American artists